Captain John Trelawny (c. 1646 – 14 May 1680) was an English army officer of Cornish descent, the eldest son of Sir Jonathan Trelawny, 2nd Baronet.

Trelawny was appointed a Gentleman of the Privy Chamber in 1674, and was returned as Member of Parliament for West Looe in 1677.

He married Catherine Jenkyn and was killed, without issue, at Tangier, predeceasing his father.

References

1640s births
1680 deaths
Politicians from Cornwall
English army officers
Members of the pre-1707 English Parliament for constituencies in Cornwall
Gentlemen of the Privy Chamber
English MPs 1661–1679
English MPs 1679
English MPs 1680–1681
English military personnel killed in action
Soldiers of the Tangier Garrison
Heirs apparent who never acceded